John Samuel Wilson (April 25, 1903 – August 27, 1980) was a professional baseball pitcher. He played parts of two seasons in Major League Baseball, 1927 and 1928, for the Boston Red Sox. He was born in Coal City, Alabama.

In his major league career, Wilson posted a 0–2 record with nine strikeouts and a 4.45 ERA in seven appearances, including two starts, two complete games, and 30.1 innings pitched. He continued to play minor league baseball as late as 1945.

Wilson died at the age of 77 in Chattanooga, Tennessee.

External links

Baseball Almanac
Retrosheet
Baseball in Wartime

Major League Baseball pitchers
Boston Red Sox players
Sanford Celeryfeds players
Buffalo Bisons (minor league) players
Jersey City Skeeters players
Fort Worth Cats players
Toronto Maple Leafs (International League) players
Indianapolis Indians players
Atlanta Crackers players
Montgomery Rebels players
Chattanooga Lookouts players
Baseball players from Alabama
1903 births
1980 deaths